Börje Larsson is a Swedish former sailor in the Star class. He won the 1969 Star European Championships with the crew Göran Tell.
In 1989-90, he was a crewmember on boat The Card in the Whitbread Round the World Race.

Achievements

References

External links
 

Swedish male sailors (sport)
Star class sailors
Year of birth missing (living people)
Volvo Ocean Race sailors
Living people